Jonás Ramalho Chimeno (born 10 June 1993) is a professional footballer who plays as a central defender for Málaga CF and the Angola national team.

In 2011, he was the first mixed-race player to appear for Athletic Bilbao – who only field Basque players – in an official competition. During his career, he represented mainly that club and Girona.

Born in Spain, Ramalho made his debut for Angola in 2020.

Club career

Athletic Bilbao
Ramalho was born in Barakaldo, Biscay, to a Basque mother and an Angolan father. A product of Athletic Bilbao's famed youth system at Lezama, he first appeared with the main squad at only 14, featuring as a substitute in a friendly match against SD Amorebieta to become its youngest player of all time. As a senior, he had only played once for the reserves when he received his first call-up for the first team, being named in the 18-man list for a UEFA Europa League match at home to SV Werder Bremen, filling in for regular Andoni Iraola as the side was already qualified; however, he did not leave the bench in the 0–3 group stage home loss on 16 December 2009.

Ramalho made his La Liga debut on 20 November 2011 at the age of 18 years and five months, sent on by coach Marcelo Bielsa to play the last five minutes in place of Fernando Llorente a 2–1 away win against Sevilla FC. On 2 August of the following year he made his first appearance in European competition, starting in a 3–1 home victory over NK Slaven Belupo in that season's UEFA Europa League.

Girona
In 2013, Ramalho was loaned to Girona FC, playing regularly in two Segunda División seasons. In May 2015, shortly after suffering a serious knee injury away to Deportivo Alavés, he signed a new contract to keep him at Athletic for the upcoming campaign.

On 7 June 2016, after suffering relegation with the B side, Ramalho was released by Athletic Bilbao. He returned to Girona late in the month, now in a permanent deal.

Ramalho left the Catalan club after its relegation in 2019, but returned to on 20 August of that year after agreeing to a three-year contract.

Osasuna
Ramalho returned to the top division on 1 February 2021, loaned to CA Osasuna until 30 June with a buying option. He signed a permanent one-year contract with the club on 5 July.

Málaga
On 15 July 2022, Ramalho agreed to a two-year deal with second division side Málaga CF.

International career
Ramalho was part of the Spanish under-19 squads which won the European Championship in 2011 and 2012. With the team already qualified for the knockout stages as group winners, he was fielded by coach Ginés Meléndez for the final group game in the former competition in Chiajna, scoring an own goal which opened a 3–0 victory for Turkey.

Ramalho was called up by Angola manager Srđan Vasiljević in a preliminary squad for the 2019 Africa Cup of Nations, but was one of three players cut before the final tournament in Egypt. He was again selected in September 2020, winning his first cap the following month in the 3–0 defeat of Mozambique held in Rio Maior.

Career statistics

Club

International

Honours
Spain U19
UEFA European Under-19 Championship: 2011, 2012

References

External links

1993 births
Living people
Spanish people of Angolan descent
Angolan people of Spanish descent
Spanish sportspeople of African descent
Spanish footballers
Angolan footballers
Footballers from Barakaldo
Association football defenders
La Liga players
Segunda División players
Segunda División B players
Tercera División players
CD Basconia footballers
Bilbao Athletic footballers
Athletic Bilbao footballers
Girona FC players
CA Osasuna players
Málaga CF players
Spain youth international footballers
Angola international footballers